The Milt Jackson Big 4 is a live album by vibraphonist Milt Jackson featuring pianist Oscar Peterson  recorded at the Montreux Jazz Festival in 1975 and released on the Pablo label.

Reception
The Allmusic review by Scott Yanow awarded the album 4½ stars stating "Bags and O.P. always bring out the best in each other and this well-conceived set is no exception".

Track listing
 "Fuji Mama" (Blue Mitchell) - 6:34 
 "Everything Must Change" (Bernard Ighner) - 6:21 
 "Speedball" (Lee Morgan) - 7:54 
 "Nature Boy" (eden ahbez) - 4:30 
 "Stella by Starlight" (Ned Washington, Victor Young) - 7:20 
 "Like Someone in Love" (Johnny Burke, Jimmy van Heusen) - 5:56 
 "Night Mist Blues" (Ahmad Jamal) - 6:36 
 "Mack the Knife" (Bertolt Brecht, Kurt Weill) - 6:31 
Recorded at the Montreux Jazz Festival at the Casino de Montreux in Switzerland on July 17, 1975

Personnel
Milt Jackson – vibes
Oscar Peterson - piano
Niels-Henning Ørsted Pedersen - bass
Mickey Roker - drums

References 

Pablo Records live albums
Milt Jackson albums
Albums produced by Norman Granz
Albums recorded at the Montreux Jazz Festival
1975 live albums